"Wait a Minute!" is a single by Willow, taken from her debut album Ardipithecus. It was released alongside its parent album by Roc Nation and Interscope Records on December 11, 2015. The song's lyrics were written by Willow, while music and production were handled by producer James Chul Rim.

Commercial performance
"Wait a Minute!" saw little success upon release in 2015. It was not until four years later that it started to gain traction. In the spring of 2019, the track inspired the #HereRightNow dance challenge on the social media platform TikTok, where it went viral becoming a sleeper hit.

In the spring of 2022, the track experienced a resurgence in popularity after a sped-up remix went viral on TikTok, reaching the Top 40 in countries including Australia, New Zealand, and the Netherlands.

Charts

Weekly charts

Year-end charts

Certifications

References

2015 singles
Willow Smith songs
Songs written by Willow Smith
Interscope Records singles
Alternative R&B songs